KCBF (820 AM) is a commercial radio station airing sports programming in Fairbanks, Alaska. KCBF obtains its programming from ESPN Radio.

It signed on in 1948 as KFRB on 1290 kHz. It moved to 790 kHz in 1953 then to 900 kHz in 1954. It moved to its current frequency in 1981.

KCBF is the exclusive radio home to University of Alaska Nanooks hockey. The station also serves coverage of the Nanooks' men's and select women's basketball games. It was also the former radio home of Fairbanks Grizzlies football.

KCBF is also the Fairbanks radio affiliate for the NFL on Westwood One Sports and the NCAA radio network during the Final Four men's basketball tournament.

References

External links
FCC History Cards for KCBF
820 Sports Website

1948 establishments in Alaska
Radio stations established in 1948
CBF
Sports radio stations in the United States
ESPN Radio stations